Çerkezköy railway station is a railway station in Çerkezköy, Turkey. TCDD Taşımacılık operates three daily (four in summer months) trains, from Istanbul, that stop at the station. Two of these trains are international trains to Sofia, Bulgaria and Bucharest, Romania, the latter being seasonal. The other two trains are regional services to Kapıkule and Istanbul.

Çerkezköy has two platforms serving three tracks. Adjacent to the platforms are a small freight yard, which handles traffic from the nearby logistics facility.

The station was originally opened in 1873 by the Oriental Railway as part of their railway from Istanbul to Vienna.

Images

References

External links

Çerkezköy station timetable

Railway stations in Tekirdağ Province
Çerkezköy District
Railway stations opened in 1873
1873 establishments in the Ottoman Empire